The 1919 Mississippi gubernatorial election took place on November 4, 1919, in order to elect the Governor of Mississippi. Incumbent Democrat Theodore G. Bilbo was term-limited, and could not run for reelection to a second term. As was common at the time, the Democratic candidate won in a landslide in the general election so therefore the Democratic primary was the real contest, and winning the primary was considered tantamount to election.

Democratic primary
No candidate received a majority in the Democratic primary, which featured 4 contenders, so a runoff was held between the top two candidates. The runoff election was won by Lieutenant Governor Lee M. Russell, who defeated Oscar G. Johnston.

Results

Runoff

General election
In the general election, Russell easily defeated Socialist candidate J. T. Lester, who was also the party's nominee in 1915.

Results

References

1919
gubernatorial
Mississippi
November 1919 events